Crinkle Crags is a fell in the English Lake District in the county of Cumbria. It forms part of two major rings of mountains, surrounding the valleys of Great Langdale and Upper Eskdale. The name reflects the fell's physical appearance as its summit ridge is a series of five rises and depressions (crinkles) that are very distinctive from the valley floor. In Old English, cringol means twisted or wrinkled.

Topography

The nomenclature of the various tops is very confused. Traditional guidebooks tend to rely on what the eye sees and therefore focus attention upon the five ‘crinkles’ of the summit ridge. These are generally referred to as the first to fifth crinkles, but Richards starts in the north, Birkett  in the south and Wainwright  employs both conventions, depending upon the direction of travel. For clarity in this article the first crinkle will be taken as the southernmost top. On this basis, the second Crinkle (also called Long Top) is the true summit of the fell. The only other Crinkle with a definitive name is Gunson Knott, but this name is used variously for the third and the fifth, with both the Ordnance Survey and the Database of British and Irish Hills listing it twice. To the north of the Crinkles proper is a depression and then the outcropping continues over Shelter Crags.

In recent times more systematic hill lists have been produced based upon topographical prominence and height, rather than mere visual appeal. Most relevant to Crinkle Crags are the lists of Hewitts and Nuttalls. These variously list the summit, the first Crinkle (Crinkle Crags South Top), and two tops on Shelter Crags (Shelter Crags and Shelter Crags North Top), but exclude the other three Crinkles, although the third (sometimes named Gunson Knott), fourth and fifth (also sometimes named Gunson Knott) are all Birketts.

The ridge of Crinkle Crags extends due south from its higher neighbour, Bowfell. Between the two is the col of Three Tarns, named for the small pools in the depression. Depending upon recent rainfall there may be anything from two to five tarns in evidence on the ground. From here the rocky outcropping of Shelter Crags is quickly reached.

Beyond the summit to the south, the ridge descends over Stonesty Pike (a Birkett) and Little Stand (a Nuttall and a Fellranger) to the Duddon Valley at Cockley Beck. Two further ridges branch out from Crinkle Crags on either side of the summit, before turning south to run parallel to Little Stand. On the west, across the marshy trench of Moasdale is Hard Knott. To the east an initially indistinct ridge firms up on the traverse to Cold Pike. Between Cold Pike and Crinkle Crags, but generally included as part of the latter is the further Nuttall of Great Knott.

Ascents

In his Pictorial Guide to the Lakeland Fells, Alfred Wainwright describes Crinkle Crags as

Much too good to be missed ... this is a climb deserving of high priority.
 
There are a variety of routes directly to the summit: most people climb the fell from Great Langdale and usually together with all or some of the adjoining fells of Bowfell, Pike of Blisco, Rossett Pike and Cold Pike to make a high-level ridge walk which encompasses the whole of the high ground at the head of Great Langdale. The ascent from Eskdale is very good, but that is at least a 15-kilometre (9-mile) round trip (depending on where in Eskdale one starts), and many people will think that this too far to "bag" just one fell. The shortest and quickest route requires the use of a car to the top of the Wrynose Pass motor road.

Summit
The traverse of the summit ridge with its series of undulations is an exhilarating experience for the fell walker. The ridge includes the so-called "Bad Step", a steep declivity which catches out many walkers when travelling from north to south; however, the obstacle can be by-passed without too much trouble.

The view from the summit is very good: there are airy views of Great Langdale, Eskdale and Dunnerdale, with the estuaries of the rivers Duddon and Esk well seen as they enter the Irish Sea. There is a very good view of England's highest mountain, Scafell Pike, which lies just four kilometres (2½ miles) away to the north west. Shelter Crags gives extensive all-round views.

Panorama

See also

List of hills in the Lake District

Gallery

References

Fells of the Lake District
Hewitts of England
Nuttalls
Borough of Copeland
South Lakeland District